The discography of American singer August Alsina consists of three studio albums, two extended plays, five mixtapes and thirty singles (including eight as a featured artist).

Singles

As lead artist

As featured artist

Guest appearances

Music videos

References

Discographies of American artists